San Angelo degli Zoppi is a Gothic-style oratory or prayer hall, located in Campo Sant'Angelo in the Sestiere of San Marco, in Venice, Italy.

Description
The oratory was founded by the Morosini family before the year 1000, and dedicated to St Gabriel Archangel. It has also been called the Oratorio della Beata Vergine e di San Michele, and Oratorio dell'Annuziata. It contains paintings depicting an Annunciation by Antonio Triva, a Blind newborn by Sante Peranda, a Birth of Mary by Giuseppe Cesari, and a Via Crucis by Vincenzo Cherubini.

See also
Catholic Church in Italy

References

Roman Catholic churches in Venice
Gothic architecture in Venice
11th-century Roman Catholic church buildings in Italy